Running on Air is the fourth studio album by the Australian hip hop trio Bliss n Eso. It was released on 30 July 2010. The album debuted at No. 1 in Australia for the week commencing 9 August 2010. It has since been certified Platinum by ARIA. It was nominated by Australian radio station, Triple J for Album of the Year, along with Megan Washington's I Believe You Liar, and Birds of Tokyo's Birds of Tokyo.

At the J Awards of 2010, the album was nominated for Australian Album of the Year.

Track listing
"Never Land" – 2:10 (Skit) (features a sample from the 1960 film The Fugitive Kind)
"Flying Through the City" – 3:17 (Prod. M-Phazes & Bliss)
"Addicted" – 3:51 (Prod. Hattori Hunzo)
"Down by the River" – 2:54 (Prod. Hattori Hunzo)
"The Moses Twist" – 4:16 (Prod. Hattori Hunzo)
"Art House Audio" – 3:02 (Prod. M-Phazes & Bliss)
"Family Affair" – 3:56 (Prod. Hattori Hunzo)
"Reflections" – 3:05 (Prod. Hattori Hunzo)
"Coastal Kids" – 3:57 (Prod. Bonobo)
"People Up on It" (featuring Xzibit) – 4:26 (Prod. Hattori Hunzo)
"Caught at the Pub" – 2:05 (Skit)
"Where the Wild Things Are" (featuring Mind Over Matter) – 4:12 (Prod. Hattori Hunzo)
"The Children of the Night" – 4:47 (Prod. M-Phazes & Bliss)
"Smoke Like a Fire" (featuring RZA) – 3:52 (Prod. Hattori Hunzo)
"Re-Debating Reality" – 0:51 (Skit)
"Late One Night" – 3:42 (Prod. Hattori Hunzo) (features a sample of Rattlin' Bones by Kasey Chambers and Shane Nicholson)
"I Can" (featuring Jehst) – 4:13 (Prod. M-Phazes)
"Weightless Wings" – 3:29 (Prod. Matik)
"Golden Years" – 2:58 (Prod. Hattori Hunzo, co-prod. Bliss)

Charts

Weekly charts

Year-end charts

References

2010 albums
Bliss n Eso albums